Pseudargyrotoza leucophracta is a moth of the family Tortricidae. It is found in Yunnan, China.

References

Cnephasiini
Moths described in 1937